Elections for the Palestinian National Authority (PNA) were held in Palestinian Autonomous areas from 1994 until their transition into the State of Palestine in 2013. Elections were scheduled to be held in 2009, but was postponed because of the Fatah–Hamas conflict. President Mahmoud Abbas agreed to stay on until the next election, but he is recognized as president only in the West Bank and not by Hamas in Gaza. The Palestinian National Authority has held several elections in the Palestinian territories, including elections for president, the legislature and local councils. The PNA has a multi-party system, with numerous parties. In this system, Fatah is the dominant party.

The first legislative and presidential elections were held in 1996; the first local elections in January–May 2005. Previous (failed) Legislative Council elections were held in 1923 under the British Mandate, and previous municipal elections were held in 1972 and 1976, organized by the Israeli government.

The Palestinian Legislative Council passed a law in June 2005 (signed by Abbas on 13 August 2005), to increase the number of members from 88 to 132, with half to be elected using proportional representation and half by plurality-at-large voting in traditional constituencies. The January 2005 presidential election was won by Abbas of Fatah, while the January 2006 legislative election was won by Hamas. In 2007, a presidential decree abolished the constituency seats with all seats to be elected from a national list, and prohibited parties which did not acknowledge the PLO's right to represent the Palestinian people (specifically Hamas) from contesting the election. An opinion poll suggested that a majority of Palestinians supported the change, while Hamas called it illegal.

Importance of the elections 

Elections in the Palestinian Authority are held to exercise the Palestinian right to self-determination in connection with their right to establish their own state, but are held under military occupation. They are held in the framework of the Oslo Accords, meaning that the power of the PNA was (and is) limited to matters such as culture, education, ID-cards, and the distribution of land and water as per the Oslo Interim Agreement.

Israel does not allow free exercise of political activities; checkpoints and separation walls hinder many social activities. The Legislative Council cannot properly function because free travel is impossible, especially between Gaza and the West Bank, regardless of hostilities between Fatah and Hamas. Members of the Palestinian Legislative Council and other politicians have been subject to lengthy detentions by Israel or even killed,  on account of their involvement in acts of terror, particularly those of Hamas, which may owe to the fact that it has been labeled a terrorist organization by the United States, Israel, the United Kingdom, the European Union, New Zealand, Australia, and Japan. In October 2007, 2 ex-ministers and 45 PLC members were in Israeli detention. In July 2012, there were 4,706 Palestinian prisoners in Israeli prisons. Of these, 22 were PLC members, of which 18 were in administrative detention. The November 2013 figures of Addameer give about 5,000 prisoners imprisoned by Israel, of which 14 are members of the Palestinian Legislative Council (10 PLC members in administrative detention).

In the Gaza Strip

Following the Fatah–Hamas conflict that started in 2006, Hamas formed a government ruling the Gaza Strip without elections. Gazan Prime Minister Haniyye announced in September 2012 the formation of a second Hamas government, also without elections.

Parliamentary elections

1996 parliamentary elections

At the 1996 general election, Fatah won 55 of the 88 seats from multi-member constituencies, with the number of representatives from each constituency determined by population. Some seats were set aside for the Christian and Samaritan communities. 51 seats were allocated to the West Bank, 37 to the Gaza Strip. Five out of 25 female candidates won a seat.

2006 parliamentary elections

At the 2006 legislative election, six parties and 4 independents won seats. Change and Reform (i.e., Hamas) won 44.45% of the vote and 74 seats, while Fatah won 41.43% of the vote and 45 seats.

Presidential elections

1996 presidential elections

The 1996 president election was won by Yassir Arafat with 88.2% of the vote.

2005 presidential elections

Mahmoud Abbas gained 62.52% of the vote at the 2005 presidential election, while his most important competing candidate, Mustafa Barghouti, won 19.48%.

Local elections

2005 local elections
Local elections in 2005 were held in four stages, but were never completed. The last stage was on December 23, 2005, with elections in 26 municipalities that had over 140,000 registered voters in Jericho and 25 villages in the West Bank. The elections were observed by the Congress of the Council of Europe, with the head of mission, Christopher Newbury, commenting "Inside the polling stations, the Congress observed a free and fair election. Outside them, further improvements remain to be made."

Further local elections were planned, as over a quarter of the Palestinian population had had no chance to vote in them, including those in major towns such as Hebron, but they did not take place, due to conflict between Hamas and Fatah after the legislative elections of 2006.

2010 and 2012 local elections

Four year term of local councils in Palestinian Authority expired in January 2009. Council of Ministers called for local elections to be held on 17 July 2010, but after Fatah proved incapable of agreeing on list of candidates, the call for elections was canceled on 10 June 2010. The election was postponed and was later held in 2012 after several delays.

See Timeline of the 2012 Local Elections

See here for a useful set of maps in Arabic.

2016 and 2017 local elections

The elections were planned for October 8, 2016 but were delayed until May 13, 2017.

2021-22 local elections 

The elections were held on 11 December 2021.

Central Elections Commission
Following the establishment of the Palestinian Authority in 1993, the "Elections Commission" was formed to conduct the Palestinian presidential and legislative elections in 1996, the first elections in the Palestinian Authority. The Palestinian Central Bureau of Statistics (PCBS) was given the task of voter registration.

The Central Elections Commission (CEC) was established in October 2002 as an independent and neutral body under the General Elections Law of 1995. The Elections Law, issued in August 2005, stipulated that the CEC is "the supreme body that undertakes the management, supervision, preparation and organization of elections and to take all necessary measures to ensure its integrity and freedom". Hanna Nasir has been the chairman of the CEC since 2002.

Under the Local Council Elections Law No. (10) of 2005, the CEC became responsible for organizing local council elections, in addition to organizing elections of the President of the Palestinian National Authority and members of the Palestinian Legislative Council.

External election assistance
The Elections Reform Support Group (ERSG) was formed with support from the United States and the European Union to support Palestinian elections. One of the leading organizations for the ESRG is the International Foundation for Electoral Systems, which has actively  assisted the Central Election Commission in 2004–2005 with the help of USAID. They continue to support the election commission.

See also
 1923 Palestinian Legislative Council election
 Electoral calendar
 Electoral system

Notes

References

External links
None of these URL showed proper information. They report 404 errors
 Palestinian Authority Election Tracker
Adam Carr's Election Archive
Pressure mounts on Hamas after win

 
Elections in the State of Palestine